Theodore Harper McCrea (March 27, 1908 – September 22, 1986) was a suffragan bishop of the Episcopal Diocese of Dallas, serving from 1962 to 1975.

Early life and education
McCrea was born on March 27, 1908, in Minneapolis, to the Reverend Christopher Harper McCrea and Elizabeth Amelia Pratt. He was educated at the high school in New Trier, Minnesota, and then at the University of Minnesota from where he graduated with a Bachelor of Arts in 1929. he also earned a Masters of Arts in 1930 from Harvard University and a Bachelor of Sacred Theology in 1943 from the General Theological Seminary. In 1964 he was awarded a Doctor of Sacred Theology.

Ordained ministry
McCrea was ordained a deacon in the Episcopal Church on June 7, 1943, at the Church of the Advent in Boston by the Bishop of Massachusetts Henry Knox Sherrill,  and priest in December of the same year by Bishop James De Wolf Perry of Rhode Island. He served as assistant minister at St Martin's Church in Providence, Rhode Island, between 1943 and 1946 and then priest-in-charge of St John's Mission in Dallas. In 1948, St John's became a parish church and hence McCrea became its first rector. Simultaneously he was also principal and chaplain of the adjoining school.

Episcopacy
McCrea was elected Suffragan Bishop of Dallas on September 14, 1962, on the seventh ballot during a special convention which took place at the Church if St Michael and All Angels in Dallas. He was consecrated on December 4, 1962, in St Matthew's Cathedral by Presiding Bishop Arthur C. Lichtenberger. He remained in office until his retirement in 1975. He died on September 22, 1986, in Dallas due to heart problems.

References

External links 

1908 births
1986 deaths
University of Minnesota alumni
Harvard University alumni
20th-century American Episcopalians
Episcopal bishops of Dallas
20th-century American clergy
Converts to Anglicanism from Methodism
General Theological Seminary alumni